Judge Thomas may refer to:

Alfred Delavan Thomas (1837–1896), judge of the United States District Court for the District of North Dakota
Clarence Thomas (born 1948), judge of the United States Court of Appeals for the District of Columbia Circuit prior to serving on the Supreme Court of the United States
Daniel Holcombe Thomas (1906–2000), judge of the United States District Court for the Southern District of Alabama
Edward B. Thomas (1848–1929), judge of the United States District Court for the Eastern District of New York
Edwin Stark Thomas (1872–1952), judge of the United States District Court for the District of Connecticut
Holly A. Thomas (born 1979), judge of the United States Court of Appeals for the Ninth Circuit
Seth Thomas (judge) (1873–1962), judge of the United States Court of Appeals for the Eighth Circuit
Sidney R. Thomas (born 1953), judge of the United States Court of Appeals for the Ninth Circuit
Ted Thomas (judge) (born 1934), judge of the Court of Appeal of New Zealand
William Kernahan Thomas (1911–2001), judge of the United States District Court for the Northern District of Ohio

See also
Justice Thomas (disambiguation)